The Liddon Gulf is a large inlet on the south-west side of Melville Island, Northwest Territories, Canada.  It joins the M'Clure Strait to the south-west.

Gulfs of the Northwest Territories
Gulfs of the Arctic Ocean